Gudgeri  is a village in the Kundgol taluk of Dharwad district in the Indian state of Karnataka.

Importance
Kalasa is the birthplace of Sri Guru Govinda Bhatta, Guru of Sri Shishunala Sharif.

See also
Shishuvinahala
Gudgeri
Lakshmeshwar
Savanur
Kundgol
Dharwad
Karnataka

References

External links
 http://Dharwad.nic.in/

Villages in Dharwad district